

1981

See also 
 1981 in Australia
 1981 in Australian television

References

External links 
 Australian film at the Internet Movie Database

Australian
 Films
1981
Australka
Films